Lady Otsuya (おつやの方 Otsuya no Kata) was a Japanese female samurai (onna-musha) from the Sengoku period. She was the aunt of the famous samurai Oda Nobunaga, the wife of Tōyama Kagetō and foster mother of Oda Katsunaga. She was the ruler of Iwamura Castle until the last days of her life.

Otsuya is best known for having conspired against the Oda clan and fought against her nephew, Oda Nobunaga. Her execution under Nobunaga may have been one of the reasons for the decline in Nobunaga's reputation, who would later be murdered by Akechi Mitsuhide and others traitors in the Incident of Honnoji.

Life 
Otsuya no kata was the daughter of Oda Nobusada, a warlord in the country of Owari. She was the sister of Oda Nobuhide (Nobunaga's father). She married Tōyama Kagetō, the lord of Iwamura Castle and retainer of the Oda clan. The Iwamura Castle is one of Japan’s three major mountain castles located in Ena City, Gifu.

Iwamura is the highest castle in Japan built atop a 717-meter-high peak by taking advantage of the steepness of the mountain that has a 180-meter altitude difference. The castle has survived 700 years, which is unparalleled in Japan’s history. It is also known as the “Misty Castle” because even the climate worked in favor of the castle by hiding it from enemies with a blanket of fog. This castle is renowned for have been ruled by a woman, Lady Otsuya, described as possessing “unmatched beauty.”

Siege of Iwamura castle 

At the apex of the anti-Nobunaga coalition, in 1572, Takeda Shingen ordered Akiyama Nobutomo, one of the "Twenty-Four Generals" of Shingen, to attack the castle, but Otsuya and her husband were prepared to defend. After days of resistance, Tōyama Kagetō, the commander of the castle's garrison, fell ill and died. Lady Otsuya became the female lord of Iwamura castle. Toyama used to be subordinate to Takeda, but at that time Nobunaga Oda's aunt Lady Otsuya had a hostile relationship with Takeda. She didn't surrender for months and continued to defend the castle until March 6, 1573 when she made an agreement with the Takeda clan. Akiyama Nobutomo negotiated the castle's surrender with Lady Otsuya, and she settled in a peace treaty without bloodshed and ceased attacks. The adopted son of Otsuya and the official keeper of the castle, a seven-year-old lord called Gobōmaru (Oda Katsunaga) was taken to the Takeda home in the province of Kai as a hostage. In accordance with the surrender treaty, Lady Otsuya married Akiyama. Otsuya surrendered the castle to the Takeda and became a member of it and an enemy of Nobunaga. This caused the Takeda-Oda relationship to decline and Nobunaga started a campaign against the Takeda clan.

On March 15, 800 soldiers led by Baba Nobuharu, who were attacking Iwamura Castle, attacked the Oda Army and Oda Nobunaga pulled 10,000 soldiers. When Nobunaga learned that the soldiers at Iwamura's castle, led by his aunt, had attacked the troops of the Oda clan, he decided to counterattack.

On April 12, 1573 Shingen died, and on December 22 of the same year, the Battle of Mikatagahara took place, an event that led Lady Otsuya to lead the defense of Iwamura Castle once again. The Iwamura Castle was a battlefield from 1572 to 1575. When Oda army defeated the army of Shingen's son, Takeda Katsuyori, in the Battle of Nagashino, Oda Nobutada and others surrounded Iwamura castle. In 1575, Oda Nobunaga decided to attack and take his aunt's castle, but she defended it against Oda's fierce assault for a half a year. After six months of battle, she left the castle to respond to Oda's false plea for peace. However Nobunaga reneged on his word and had Otsuya and Nobutomo crucified as traitors on December 23, 1575.

It is said that as she was dying, Lady Otsuya cursed Nobunaga, telling him that if he killed family, his punishment would be doubled. Seven years later, her prediction came true when a trusted general, Akechi Mitsuhide, turned on Nobunaga and killed him in the Honno-ji Incident.

Legacy 
Since 1992, the residents living close to Iwamura, Ena City, Gifu Prefecture, have hung a short [split] curtain hung at the entrance of a room indicating the names of female members of each family to the memory of Otsuya no kata, who was the castellan of the area.

See also 
 List of female castellans in Japan

References 

People of Sengoku-period Japan
Women of medieval Japan
1575 deaths
Samurai
Otsuya
Japanese women in warfare
16th-century Japanese people
Women in 16th-century warfare
16th-century Japanese women
16th-century women rulers